Şırnak is an electoral district of the Grand National Assembly of Turkey. It elects four members of parliament (deputies) to represent the province of the same name for a four-year term by the D'Hondt method, a party-list proportional representation system.

Members 
Population reviews of each electoral district are conducted before each general election, which can lead to certain districts being granted a smaller or greater number of parliamentary seats. Şırnak became a province in 1990 and first sent members of parliament to Ankara - three of them - the following year. The seat allocation was increased to four ahead of the 2011 election.

There are currently four sitting members of parliament representing Şırnak, one of which is from the governing party. Şırnak was a district where the pro-Kurdish Peace and Democracy Party (BDP) ran independent candidates in an attempt to overcome the 10 percent national electoral threshold. Three independent candidates were elected here in 2011; all have since joined the BDP.

General elections 
Election results:

2011

June 2015

November 2015

2018

Presidential elections

2014

2018

References 

Electoral districts of Turkey
Politics of Şırnak Province